Scopula micrata is a moth of the  family Geometridae. It is found on Haiti.

References

Moths described in 1858
micrata
Moths of the Caribbean